is a one-shot Japanese manga written and illustrated by Fumi Yoshinaga. Biblos released the manga in March 1999. Libre Publishing obtained the license in 2007 and released its own volume on January 4, 2007.

It is licensed and published in North America by Blu on May 8, 2007. The manga is licensed in Taiwan by Sharp Point Press.

Reception
Coolstreak Cartoons's Leroy Douresseaux comments on how the "love between two people" takes priority over everything else in the manga. Pop Shock Culture's Katherine Dacey commends the manga for "emphasizing steamy encounters between beautiful men in period costume over long-winded political discussions". Mania.com's Nadia Oxford commends Fumi Yoshinaga's artwork but criticises the backgrounds that "remain disappointingly sparse".

See also
Truly Kindly - another anthology by Yoshinaga which contains a story about two of the characters from this book.

References

External links

1999 manga
Fumi Yoshinaga
Historical anime and manga
Josei manga
Manga anthologies
Romance anime and manga
Sharp Point Press titles
Tokyopop titles
Yaoi anime and manga